Dhenkanal railway station is a railway station which serves Dhenkanal district in Indian state of Odisha.

History
Dhenkanal railway station was developed in 1922 when Talcher coalfield was linked to Howrah–Chennai line. A double track was already present up to Talcher Town for facilitation of movement of coal. The Talcher–Sambalpur rail line was sanctioned in 1983. Construction of the Talcher–Sambalpur line began in 1987 and ended in 1996 and the line became operational in 1998.

Services
The number of halting trains in Dhenkanal railway station is 48. It handles more than 2,000 passengers daily. It has direct trains to New Delhi, Mumbai and also connects Western Odisha to the state capital Bhubaneswar.

The Dhenkanal railway station is on the Cuttack–Sambalpur section of East Coast railway line, which is a major route connecting Western Odisha to Coastal Odisha. It is directly connected to Mumbai, Delhi, Kolkata, Surat, Ranchi, Ahmedabad, Bhubaneswar, Nagpur, Bhopal, Vishakhapatnam, Amritsar, Raipur, Cuttack, Puri, Rourkela, and Sambalpur.

Gallery

References

Railway stations in Dhenkanal district
Khurda Road railway division
Railway stations opened in 1922